Grey Hairs is the third studio album by American rapper Reks. The album was released on July 22, 2008 through ShowOff Records.

Track listing

References

Reks albums
2008 albums
Albums produced by DJ Premier
Albums produced by Statik Selektah
Albums produced by Large Professor